Aglets is a Java-based mobile agent platform and library for building mobile agents based applications. An aglet is a Java agent which can autonomously and spontaneously move from one host to another carrying a piece of code with it. It can be programmed to execute at a remote host and show different behaviours at different hosts. Java based security implementations take care of authorised access to local resources at the remote hosts.

Aglets was originally developed by Mitsuru Oshima ("") and Danny Lange at the IBM Tokyo Research Laboratory. The original name of the project was AWB (Aglets WorkBench) and IBM was responsible for most of the 1.x release. However the project is now hosted at SourceForge.net as an open source project, where it is distributed under the IBM Public License. In the beginning, the SourceForge releases had been only bug-fix ones, but 2.x series (most of which came from open source community only) had better security and thread management. It now includes a log4j based logging system and a few bug-fixes of the older versions.

Aglets is completely written in Java, thus allowing a high portability of both the agents and the platform. Aglets includes both a complete Java mobile agent platform, with a stand-alone server called Tahiti, and a library that allows developers to build mobile agents and to embed the Aglets technology in their applications.

No new releases of Aglets have been made since 2001, although an updated users manual was released in 2004.  The future of the project is unclear.

See also 
Mobile agent

References

External links 
http://aglets.sourceforge.net/ — Aglets portal site
https://web.archive.org/web/20100514184915/http://www.trl.ibm.com/aglets/ — IBM Research
http://www.artima.com/underthehood/aglets.html — "The Architecture of Aglets", Bill Venners, April 1997

Java platform software
IBM software